Invasion, also known as Attraction 2, is a 2020 Russian science fiction action film directed and produced by Fyodor Bondarchuk's company by Art Pictures Studio and Vodorod. The action of the film unfolds after the events described in Attraction (2017). The film stars Irina Starshenbaum, Rinal Mukhametov, Alexander Petrov, Yuri Borisov, Oleg Menshikov, and Sergei Garmash.

Invasion is Bondarchuk’s third film and the eighth Russian film shot in IMAX format, the film premiered in preview from the end of December 26, 2019. A wide distribution of the film was released in Russia on January 1, 2020 by WDSSPR. It was the final film distributed by WDSSPR before its dissolution between Walt Disney Studios Sony Pictures Releasing. Sony will continue to produce and distribute their films in Russia.

Plot 
The action takes place three years after the events of Attraction. Julia (Irina Starshenbaum), who was saved from death with the help of extraterrestrial technologies, has unusual abilities now. The girl has become the object of the research conducted in secret laboratories of the Ministry of defense. Julia's new abilities attract not only people on Earth, they are becoming a threat to extraterrestrial civilizations—because of that the Earth is threatened with invasion. Hekon is back to save her. This time with the help of Sol.

Cast 
 Irina Starshenbaum as Yulia 'Yulya' Lebedeva (English: Julia)
 Rinal Mukhametov as Hekon / Khariton (English: Hakon)
 Alexander Petrov as Artyom Tkachyov, Yulya's former boyfriend 
 Yuri Borisov as  Captain Ivan 'Vanya' Korobanov
 Oleg Menshikov as General-major Valentin Lebedev
 Sergei Garmash as vice-premier
 Yevgeny Mikheev as Gleb Karakhanov "Google", a classmate and friend of Yulya, an employee of the company "Rostelecom" 
 Daniil Kolzenov as a technician 
 Sergey Troyev as TV channel technician
 Igor Kosterin as VSK Adjutant (major)
 Andrey Nazimov as IT Department Manager

Production

Development 
In March 2017, the project director Fyodor Bondarchuk officially confirmed the continuation of the project; The budget for the second part was planned in the amount of 645 million rubles. The preparatory process went on for a year and a half.

Unlike the first film, events do not take place in the Moscow district of Chertanovo, but in the central part of Moscow, including the territory of Moscow State University and beyond. As in the first part, the shooting took part in modern equipment of the Russian Armed Forces, including the Aurus Senat car in the sedan version, which was created as part of the Cortege project.

Filming
Principal photography began on July 24, 2018, covered almost 10,000 kilometers and was held in the strictest confidence. 2 film crews were shot in Moscow, and were held in strict secrecy, Kaliningrad, Kamchatka Peninsula and Hungary.

The whole district of Moscow was cordoned off at night to shoot a scene of a chase with eight cameras and a helicopter in Orlikov Lane  and on the neighbouring streets. Part of the chase was shot on an unfinished section of the fourth ring road in Moscow, which was specially filled with cars.

Artists made a mini-expedition to Kaliningrad to shoot a Finnish episode of the beginning of the film, one of the first scenes of which was shot during a real storm.

The film crew flew to Kamchatka, to Russian New Zealand, for 2 days for an astounding shooting of the final scene, shot in the Ksudach stratovolcano, the last eruption of which occurred 100 years

It was in the legendary "Origo Studio" in Budapest that some scenes of complex floods were shot with almost 450 people participating in a gigantic mobile stage formed by a gigantic pool fueled by fire hydrants where you can load jewelry. Thus, the roof of a 9-story building was built there in full size and immersed under one of the scenes of the film.

For filming underwater scenes, Irina Starshenbaum studied diving for two months before shooting. Her record is 15 hours of filming in the pool.

Music
The composer Igor Vdovin wrote the soundtrack for this film. It has been available since January 10, 2020, on Yandex Music, iTunes,
BOOM.ru and VKontakte. Recall that it was Ivan Burlyaev who wrote the book Attraction (2017).

The IMAX trailer contains the song Universe Has No End from the Imagine Music Supreme II album.

Another trailer contains a remix, also from Imagine Music, the famous tune of Swan Lake by Tchaikovsky.

Post-production 

The team of the Russian special effects studio Main Road Post, responsible for the film’s graphics, recreated Moscow to the last detail using a computer to create, a grandiose apocalyptic scene of large-scale immersion in water, “a real challenge,” says Arman Yakhin, director of the studio.

Graphic designers are also very proud of the battle scene of Artyom against the Kamov Ka-52.

Release
Invasion was released in the Russian Federation on January 1, 2020 by Walt Disney Studios Sony Pictures Releasing (WDSSPR).

Marketing
Comic-Con Russia 2019 was held in Moscow for the sixth time from October 3 to 6 at the Crocus Expo Pavilion №1. Simultaneously with the festival, the fourteenth annual exhibition of interactive entertainment "IgroMir" will be held.

Trailer 48 aired on May 23, 2019. Meanwhile, the IMAX trailer was released on December 12, 2019.

At the moment, the trailers were presented in the original Russian version with English subtitles.

Home media
Invasion is the third film of Fyodor Bondarchuk, released in IMAX format after Stalingrad (2013 film) and Attraction (2017 film).

The film was released in Russia in DVD, Blu-ray and iTunes on March 3, 2020.

Reception

Box office
As of January 12, 2020, the Invasion earned $14.8 million internationally. The creators expected that in the end, the revenue would be 3 billion rubles ($48 million).

Invasion cost $10 million. As of February 9, 2020, it had earned $16,108,069 internationally, including 82 million rubles on the first day.

The total box office receipts for the first film, Attraction (2017), totaled 44 million rubles during its first day and exceeded one billion rubles ($16 million) in the countries of the Commonwealth of Independent States. In 2017, more than 4 million viewers saw it at the cinema, and this film was also one of the most watched on VOD.

CIS, In the community of independent states, as of February 9, 2020, Invasion had 3,583,764 viewers, 993,646,969 rubles in total revenue ($16,049,862), and distributed 1,806 copies for 140,987 screenings. As of that date the film ranked second at the Russian box office in 2020, surpassing Star Wars: The Rise of Skywalker.

References

External links 
 Official website at the Art Pictures Studio 
 
 
 

2020 films
2020s Russian-language films
Alien invasions in films
Films directed by Fedor Bondarchuk
2020 science fiction action films
IMAX films
2020s dystopian films
Films about extraterrestrial life
Russian science fiction action films
Russian sequel films
Films shot in Moscow
Films about artificial intelligence
Films produced by Fyodor Bondarchuk